Canuto Cimental Robledo (January 19, 1913 – November 29, 1999) better known as Canto “TNT” Robledo (Robleto) was a Mexican-American professional boxer, trainer, & manager. Robledo was scheduled to face world bantamweight champion Panama Al Brown in late 1932 but during a tune up fight he was tragically left blind in both eyes. After retiring from boxing for a few years Robledo became best known as being the only licensed blind boxing trainer in the history of the sport. He trained both amateur and professional fighters by what he called his "sense of touch” technique.

Early life
Canto Robledo was born Canuto Cimental Robledo on January 19, 1913. He was born in Tyrone, New Mexico a small town known for its copper mining. He is the third child of seven from Felipe and Soledad Robledo who immigrated from Cienega De Escobar, Durango Mexico during the Mexican Revolution. Canto’s father worked at the mines but in 1921 copper prices dropped thus closing the mines and eventually the town. In 1922 at the age of nine Canto & his family moved west to California to find better opportunities eventually settling in Pasadena, California.

Canto attended Grover Cleveland Elementary and Washington Jr High School, the same schools where Jackie Robinson would later attend. He was an honor student and a superb athlete winning various awards in soccer & track, at age 13 he won the city championship in tennis. After completing the 9th grade Canto dropped out of school due to financial difficulties, he would work picking oranges from the nearby orange groves. He briefly trained boxing with his father for the sake of being able to defend himself, and in 1928 at Brookside Park after a scuffle with a bully a 15-year-old Canto was discovered by local Pasadena boxing promoter Morrie Cohan.

Boxing career
Robledo began his training at the Pasadena Arena which was owned and operated by his promoter Morrie Cohan. He would be trained in both the amateur and pro ranks by German Otto. After several months of rigorous training his first bout would take place at the Los Angeles Golden Gloves Boxing Tournament in 1927. The tournament was held at the Grand Olympic Auditorium, Robledo would go on to win his first bout by split decision and the remaining bouts in his weight class. After turning 16 years old he decided to turn pro and on June 29, 1929 he won his first professional fight which was held at the Main Street Athletic Club versus Johnny Gabucco.

Personal life
Robledo married his longtime love Concha Jimenez in 1932, they were a couple for over 60 years until her passing in 1988. They had four children: Gloria Robledo Romero, Raymond “Bobby” Robledo, Irene Robledo Tellez, and Joseph Canto Robledo.

Professional boxing record

Awards & recognitions
 1950 – Orv Mohler Award by Pasadena Sports Ambassadors – Humanitarian efforts in the sport of boxing
 1956 – Helms Athletic Foundation Award by Southern California Boxing Writers Association
 1958 – Mirror Award by the Boxing Association – Contributions to the art & science of boxing
 1969 – Order of Eagles Award 
 1979 – Eyewitness News on ABC – Special segment by Ines Pedroza
 1982 – Real People television show on NBC – Season 4 Episode 22 aired March 17,1982 – "Blind Boxing Coach" segment by Byron Allen
 1987 – KCOP Sports Star of the Week by KCOP 13 – Honoring extraordinary abilities & his community humanitarian efforts 
 1988 – Humanitarian Award by the World Boxing Hall of Fame – Humanitarian accomplishments in and outside the ring
 1988 – Los Angeles City Proclamation Award by L.A. County Supervisor Michael Antonovich – Efforts for his contributions to the sport of boxing and working with the youth
 2005 – World Boxing Hall of Fame, posthumous
 2010 – Joe Louis Humanitarian Medal Award by the California State Athletic Commission – For exemplified community affairs for the good of humanity
 2010 – Canto Robledo Memorial plaque at Villa Park by Pasadena Mexican American History Association – Honoring his legacy in boxing and community humanitarian efforts.
 2017 – Pasadena Sports Hall of Fame, posthumous 
 2018 – West Coast Boxing Hall of Fame, posthumous

References 

American boxers of Mexican descent
Bantamweight boxers
1913 births
1999 deaths
Boxers from New Mexico
American boxing trainers
American boxing managers
People from Pasadena, California
People from Grant County, New Mexico